Pine Creek Ski Resort is a ski resort located about seven miles northeast of Cokeville, Wyoming. From a height of 8,225 feet at the summit, the resort features 30 runs of varying difficulty. There are more black diamonds than either intermediate or beginner trails. During the regular ski season, the resort is open from 9:30AM to 4PM daily. The lodge features a snack bar and serves meals during the day.

Ticket prices
For an adult day pass, the lift tickets are 45 dollars. Half day passes for adults run 40 dollars. Child passes for day and half day run 40 and 35 dollars respectively. Season pass prices vary, and are granted based on if the skier(s) is a student, adult, or family. Prices range from 130 dollars to 650 dollars.

References

External links

Run Map
Ski resort images

Buildings and structures in Lincoln County, Wyoming
Ski areas and resorts in Wyoming
Tourist attractions in Lincoln County, Wyoming